Ndamukong Ngwa Suh (born January 6, 1987) is an American football defensive tackle who is a free agent. He played college football at Nebraska, where he earned All-American honors, and was drafted by the Detroit Lions second overall in the 2010 NFL Draft. He also played for the Miami Dolphins, Los Angeles Rams, and Tampa Bay Buccaneers. He has played in three Super Bowls: Super Bowl LIII with the Rams, Super Bowl LV with the Buccaneers, and Super Bowl LVII with the Eagles.

As a college senior, Suh became one of the most decorated players in college football history. He won numerous awards including the Associated Press College Football Player of the Year Award, Bronko Nagurski Trophy, Chuck Bednarik Award, Lombardi Award, and Outland Trophy, and was recognized as a unanimous All-American.

During his time with the Lions, Suh was selected to 4 All-Pro and Pro Bowl teams and was awarded Defensive Rookie of the Year in 2010. In 2015, Suh became the highest-paid defensive player in NFL history, having signed a six-year contract with the Miami Dolphins, worth in excess of $114 million, with nearly $60 million fully guaranteed; he was released after just three seasons. Early in his career, Suh was criticized for his aggressive style of play and lack of sportsmanship. Suh was one of four defensive tackles named to the NFL 2010's All-Decade Team.

Early years
Suh was born in Portland, Oregon. He attended Grant High School in Portland, where he was a four-sport star in football, basketball, soccer and track and field. He played as a two-way lineman for the Grant Generals. Suh earned first-team All-PIL honors on both offense and defense as a junior and was an honorable-mention All-state pick. In his senior year, he collected 65 tackles, including 10 sacks and recovered four fumbles, which earned him Parade magazine high school All-America honors, the 2004 Portland Interscholastic League Defensive Player of the Year, and a Class 4A first-team all-state selection. He also played in the 2005 U.S. Army All-American Bowl. In basketball, he earned honorable-mention All-League honors as a junior and senior.

Also a track & field athlete, Suh was one of the state's top performers in the shot put. He was the district shot put champion in 2004, and won the OSAA Class 4A shot put title in 2005 with a school-record throw of 18.71 meters (61 ft, 4 in). For his all-around athletic accomplishments, Suh was a finalist for the Portland Tribune’s Athlete of the Year.

Considered a four-star recruit by Rivals.com, Suh was the sixth ranked defensive tackle in the United States. Recruited by many, Suh took official visits to Nebraska, Mississippi State, Oregon State, Miami (FL), and California, before committing to the Nebraska Cornhuskers on January 20, 2005.

College career

Suh attended the University of Nebraska, where he played for the Nebraska Cornhuskers football team from 2005 to 2009. As a true freshman in 2005, Suh played in the first two games before missing the remainder of the season after undergoing knee surgery. He received a medical redshirt.

In 2006, Suh played in all 14 games as a backup defensive lineman and earned freshman All-Big 12 honors from The Sporting News. Despite coming off the bench, he finished the year with 19 total tackles, and ranked among the team leaders in tackles for loss (8) and quarterback sacks (3½). In his sophomore season, Suh started in 11 of the Cornhuskers' 12 games, and recorded 34 total tackles on the season.

As a junior in 2008, Suh recorded a team-high 76 tackles, 7.5 sacks, 19 tackles for loss, two interceptions (both returned for touchdowns), and a touchdown reception while playing fullback.He became the first Nebraska defensive lineman to lead the team in tackles since 1973.  Suh earned First-team All-Big 12 honors in 2008, the first Nebraska interior defensive lineman to earn those honors since Steve Warren in 1999. He was also an honorable mention All-American.

In 2009, Suh registered 85 tackles, 12 quarterback sacks, 28 quarterback hurries, 20.5 tackles for loss, 10 pass breakups, three blocked kicks, and one interception.  Suh had 12 tackles (seven for losses, a school single-game record) and 4½ sacks in a 13–12 loss to the Texas Longhorns in the Big 12 Championship Game, for which he received game MVP honors. He helped Huskers defense rank first nationally in scoring defense (10.4 ppg), tied for second in total sacks (44), first in pass efficiency defense (87.3), seventh in total defense (272.0 ypg), ninth in rushing defense (93.1 ypg) and 18th in passing defense (178.9 ypg). He also played all four quarters versus Arizona in the 2009 Holiday Bowl, helping Nebraska record the first shutout in the Holiday Bowl's 32-year history, as well as the first shutout in school bowl history. He earned unanimous first-team All-Big 12 honors and the Big-12 Defensive Player of the Year. Nationally, he was named the Associated Press College Football Player of the Year, the recipient of the Bill Willis Trophy, Bronko Nagurski Trophy, Chuck Bednarik Award, Lombardi Award and Outland Trophy, and was recognized as a unanimous first-team All-American.  He was a finalist for the Lott Trophy, Walter Camp Award, and Heisman Trophy.

Awards
On December 3, 2009, Suh was named as one of five finalists for the Walter Camp Award. On November 24, 2009, Suh was named one of three finalists for the 2009 Outland Trophy, alongside Mike Iupati and Russell Okung. On November 10, Suh was selected one of four finalists for the 2009 Lombardi Award, the first Cornhusker to receive this honor since Dominic Raiola in 2000. In October 2009, Suh was named to The Sporting News and CBS Sports midseason All-American team. Suh began season at No. 3 on Rivals.com′s preseason defensive tackle power ranking. He was also named to the 2009 Outland Trophy watch list.

On December 7, 2009, Suh was named a finalist for the Heisman Trophy. Later that evening, Suh was named the 2009 Bronko Nagurski Trophy winner as the top defensive player in the nation. CBS Sportsline also named Suh their Defensive Player of the Year. The Touchdown Club of Columbus named Suh the winner of the Bill Willis Trophy on December 9, 2009. That same evening Suh won the Lombardi Award for the top collegiate lineman or linebacker. On December 11, at the ESPN College Football Awards show, Suh was selected as the winner of the Chuck Bednarik Award as the nation's best defensive player and took home the Outland Trophy for the best interior lineman. Suh finished fourth in the Heisman race, accumulating 815 points, the most by a fourth-place finisher for the Heisman Trophy in its history. He was also one of four unanimous selections to the AP First-team All-America in 2009. Suh was named the 2009 AP Player of Year, becoming the first defensive player to receive the award in its history.

Career statistics

Professional career

2010 NFL Draft
Suh was widely considered to be one of the best prospects available in the draft. ESPN.com's draft analyst Mel Kiper, Jr., described Suh as "maybe the most dominating defensive tackle I've seen in 32 years" and projected him to go #1 overall. Suh was seen as an ideal fit at either defensive tackle in a 4–3 defense or as a defensive end in a 3–4 defense.

For off-the-field marketing activities, Suh signed with The Agency Sports Management & Marketing, where Russ Spielman served as lead agent. At the NFL Combine, Suh bench pressed 225 lbs 32 times and had a 35½ inch vertical leap, the highest for a defensive tackle since Al Lucas (36 in) in 2000.

Before the NFL draft, Suh signed with Maximum Sports Management and agent Roosevelt Barnes. This caused moderate concern for many teams who were hoping to draft him, as this was the same agent who represented Michael Crabtree. Crabtree was the longest 2009 NFL Draft first round contract hold out, waiting over six weeks into the NFL season before signing with the San Francisco 49ers.

Despite the concerns, Suh was selected second overall in the 2010 NFL Draft by the Detroit Lions, becoming the first defensive lineman selected by the team since Luther Elliss in 1995. Suh was the highest selected Cornhusker defender since Neil Smith in 1988.

Detroit Lions

2010 season
On August 3, Suh agreed to a five-year, $68 million contract with the Lions, including $40 million guaranteed. On September 12, Suh had his first sack against Chicago Bears quarterback Jay Cutler. On October 10, during a game against the St. Louis Rams, he recorded his first and only, as of 2021, career interception off Sam Bradford. Suh scored the first touchdown of his NFL career against the Washington Redskins on October 31, 2010, on a recovery of a Rex Grossman fumble.

After an injury to Lions kicker Jason Hanson, the Lions had Suh attempt an extra point on November 7, 2010, against the New York Jets. However, Suh missed the extra point when the ball hit the right upright.

For the 2010 season, Suh led the Lions, all rookies, and all defensive tackles in sacks with 10. He was picked as a starter for the Pro Bowl, becoming the first Lions rookie since Barry Sanders to be picked as a Pro Bowl starter. He missed the game, however, due to shoulder surgery. On January 25, 2011, Suh was named to the All-Pro Team. He was also named the Sporting News Rookie of the Year, the Pro Football Weekly and Pro Football Writers of America Rookie of the Year, the Pepsi NFL Rookie of the Year, and the AP Defensive Rookie of the Year. He was named to the NFL All-Rookie Team. He was ranked 51st by his fellow players on the NFL Top 100 Players of 2011.

His rookie year saw the beginning of what would take Suh to a league record amount of fines for on-the-field behavior. He was fined $7,500 in a preseason game against the Cleveland Browns for a facemask of Jake Delhomme, fined $5,000 for using an opponent as leverage on a field goal in a week 9 game against the Jets, and fined $15,000 in a week 13 game against the Bears for unnecessary roughness against quarterback Jay Cutler.

2011 season

During the third quarter of the Lions' Thanksgiving game against the Green Bay Packers on November 24, 2011, Suh pushed Packers' offensive lineman Evan Dietrich-Smith's head into the ground three times, then stomped on his arm.  All of this took place after the whistle was blown. Suh was penalized for unnecessary roughness and ejected from the game.  The resulting penalty gave the Packers an automatic first down. The Packers scored a touchdown two plays later, giving them a 14–0 lead and an eventual 27–15 victory.

Initially, Suh denied stomping on Dietrich-Smith, saying he was only trying to get his balance back. However, on Friday morning, the Lions issued a statement calling Suh's actions "unacceptable". Within hours, Suh wrote on his Facebook page that he'd "made a mistake" a day before and intended to learn from it. Fox Sports NFL rules analyst and former vice president of officiating Mike Pereira said that based on his knowledge of league discipline, "the question won’t be if the NFL will suspend Suh, but when—and for how many games". He drew parallels between Suh's actions and those of Albert Haynesworth, who drew a five-game suspension—the longest suspension for an on-field incident in modern NFL history—for stomping on Andre Gurode's head in 2006.

On November 29, the NFL suspended Suh for two games without pay which was $165,294 in lost wages. In announcing the decision, Roger Goodell noted that it was the fifth time Suh had been disciplined for on-field conduct. Suh appealed the decision, and the NFL held an expedited hearing before former Oakland Raiders coach Art Shell, so that a decision could be handed down before the Lions' next game, on December 4, against the New Orleans Saints. The appeal was turned down on December 2, forcing Suh to sit out the game against the Saints and the December 11 game against the Minnesota Vikings.

Suh was named a Pro Bowl alternate for the NFC after the 2011 NFL season. He finished the 2011 season with four sacks, one pass defended, and 26 tackles. He was ranked 38th by his fellow players on the NFL Top 100 Players of 2012.

2012 season
During a Thanksgiving game on November 22, 2012, Suh was involved in a play in which he kicked Houston Texans quarterback Matt Schaub in the groin. The incident resulted in a $30,000 fine from the league, nearly double the mandated fine for a second offense of "striking/kicking/kneeing" an opponent. There was speculation the size of the fine was recognition by the league of Suh's history of questionable on-field hits, while others viewed it as a "wishy-washy" and "cop-out" action by the league in issuing a large fine without a suspension. In response, NFL Commissioner Roger Goodell said that "intent is something that’s very difficult for us to ever try to make a judgment on". Suh denied the kick was intentional, stating his foot inadvertently hit Schaub as he was being dragged to the ground. Suh finished the 2012 season with eight sacks, two passes defended, and 25 tackles in 16 games (15 starts). He was named to the Pro Bowl and earned first team All-Pro honors. He was ranked 40th by his fellow players on the NFL Top 100 Players of 2013.

2013 season
In the Lions' Week 1 victory over the Minnesota Vikings, 34–24, Suh low blocked John Sullivan during a DeAndre Levy "pick 6"; the resulting personal foul nullified Levy's touchdown. Two days after the game, Suh was fined $100,000 for the hit—which, not counting lost pay for suspensions, is the largest fine ever issued to a player for on-the-field actions. He appealed the fine but the ruling was later upheld by the NFL.

In the Lions' Week 6 victory over the Cleveland Browns, Suh tackled Browns quarterback Brandon Weeden in a questionable manner. Though not called for a penalty during the game, Suh was fined $31,500 by the NFL, but the fine was later rescinded.

During a Thanksgiving game against the Green Bay Packers on November 28, 2013, Suh sacked Matt Flynn in the end zone, forcing a safety for the first time of his career. On November 29, 2013, Suh was fined $7,875 for performing a throat slash gesture during a game against the Tampa Bay Buccaneers. Suh finished the 2013 season with 5.5 sacks, 49 total tackles, 20 quarterback hits, six passes defensed, and one forced fumble. He was named to the Pro Bowl and earned first team All-Pro honors. He was ranked 40th by his fellow players on the NFL Top 100 Players of 2014.

2014 season
Suh appeared in and started all 16 games in the 2014 season. He totaled 20 quarterback hits, three passes defensed, 53 tackles and 8.5 sacks. In Week 17, against the Green Bay Packers, Suh stepped on quarterback Aaron Rodgers' calf. Suh received a one-game suspension, seemingly barring him from the Wild Card Round playoff game the following week against the Dallas Cowboys; but on appeal, arbitrator Ted Cottrell reversed the suspension, opting instead for another fine worth $70,000. He was named to the Pro Bowl and earned first team All-Pro honors. Suh played in the Wild Card Round against the Cowboys and sacked Tony Romo twice in the 24–20 loss. He was ranked 24th by his fellow players on the NFL Top 100 Players of 2015.

Miami Dolphins

2015 season
On March 11, 2015, the Miami Dolphins announced that they had signed Suh to a six-year, $114 million contract with $60 million guaranteed. The contract made him the highest-paid defensive player in NFL history, passing Houston Texans defensive end J. J. Watt.

During a game against the Washington Redskins on September 13, 2015, as Redskins' running back Alfred Morris was still lying on the ground following a tackle, Suh appeared to knock Morris's helmet off with his leg. The next day, the NFL announced that they would not discipline him, as "Suh's action was not deemed a kick". Suh started all 16 games in 2015, finishing the season with 61 tackles, six sacks, and five passes defended. He was ranked 40th on the NFL Top 100 Players of 2016.

2016 season
In 2016, Suh started all 16 games with 72 tackles, five sacks, and six passes defended. He was named to his fifth Pro Bowl. He was ranked 55th by his peers on the NFL Top 100 Players of 2017.

2017 season
During Thursday Night Football against the Baltimore Ravens in Week 8, Suh committed two unnecessary roughness penalties, including one moment where he attempted to choke Ryan Mallett and shove him out of reach. Suh claimed that his choke on Mallett was a self-defense, thinking that Mallett tried to attack him first. The Dolphins lost 40–0. Suh finished the season with 48 combined tackles, 4.5 sacks, and two forced fumbles. He was ranked 61st by his peers on the NFL Top 100 Players of 2018.

On March 14, 2018, Suh was released, to free up a large amount of salary cap, after playing three seasons with the Dolphins.

Los Angeles Rams

2018 season

On March 26, 2018, Suh signed a one-year, $14 million contract with the Los Angeles Rams. On December 2, Suh was fined $20,054 for a horse-collar tackle penalty while facing his former team, the Lions. Suh finished the season with 59 tackles and 4.5 sacks. The Rams finished the season with 13 wins and earned the second seed in the NFC. In the Divisional Round against the Dallas Cowboys, Suh recorded four tackles. In the NFC Championship Game against the New Orleans Saints, Suh had four tackles and 1.5 sacks as the Rams posted a 26–23 overtime victory and Suh reached the Super Bowl for the first time in his career. In the Super Bowl, Suh recorded two tackles in the Rams 13–3 loss to the New England Patriots.

The Rams did not offer Suh a new contract and signaled early in the free agent period of the new NFL year that they had decided to move on from him.

Tampa Bay Buccaneers

2019 season
Suh signed a one-year contract with the Tampa Bay Buccaneers on May 23, 2019. In Week 4, during a 55–40 win over the Los Angeles Rams, Suh recovered a fumble caused by a strip sack by teammate Shaquil Barrett on Jared Goff and returned it 37 yards for a touchdown, the second of his career. In Week 12, during a 35–22 win over the Atlanta Falcons, Suh scored the third fumble return touchdown of his career off a strip sack caused by teammate Jason Pierre-Paul on Matt Ryan. In the process Suh tied a Buccaneers franchise record for the most fumbles returned for touchdowns in a season held by Ronde Barber with his second. In Week 13, during a 28–11 win over the Jacksonville Jaguars, Suh had two tackles and recovered a forced fumble by teammate Carl Nassib. Overall, Suh finished the 2019 season with 41 tackles, 2.5 sacks, four passes defended, four fumble recoveries, and two defensive touchdowns. He was named to the Pro Football Hall of Fame All-2010s Team.

On March 26, 2020, Suh re-signed with the Buccaneers on a one-year contract.

2020 season
In Week 2 against the Carolina Panthers, Suh recorded his first two sacks of the season on Teddy Bridgewater during the 31–17 win. Overall, Suh finished the 2020 season with 43 tackles, six sacks, two passes defended, and one forced fumble.

In February 2021, Suh won his first Super Bowl as Tampa Bay defeated the Kansas City Chiefs by a score of 31–9 in Super Bowl LV.  During the game, Suh recorded 1.5 sacks on Patrick Mahomes.

2021 season
On April 5, 2021, Suh re-signed to a one-year, $9 million contract with the Buccaneers after testing free agency. Suh appeared in and started all 17 games for the Buccaneers and recorded 27 total tackles, 13 quarterback hits, eight tackle for losses, and six sacks.

Philadelphia Eagles

2022 season
On November 17, 2022, Suh signed a one-year contract with the Philadelphia Eagles. In eight games with the Eagles, he finished with one sack, ten total tackles, and two quarterback hits in the 2022 regular season. Suh reached Super Bowl LVII where the Eagles lost 38-35 to the Kansas City Chiefs.

Style of play
Early in his career, Suh was heavily criticized in the media by other players and by the NFL for his fiercely aggressive style of play.  Before his second pro season was finished, he had been flagged for nine personal fouls, the most of any player in the league during that time frame. In the first four years of his career, Suh was fined $216,875 by the league for four separate on-field violations. In a poll of fellow players conducted by the Sporting News, Suh was named "the dirtiest player" in the NFL. He was named the NFL's "Least-Liked Player" in a Forbes-publicized Nielsen report in October 2012. While Suh had drawn significant criticism for penalties earlier in his career, his reputation softened towards the end.  He was flagged just five times during the entire 2019 season.

NFL career statistics

Postseason

Personal life
In 2015, Forbes estimated Suh's annual income at $38.5 million.

Suh's mother, Bernadette (née Lennon) Suh, an elementary school teacher, was born in Spanish Town, Jamaica, and is a graduate of Southern Oregon University. His father, Michael Suh, a mechanical engineer, is from Cameroon and played semi-professional soccer in Germany, while also playing for the Cameroonian national team and working as a machinist. They met and married in Portland, Oregon, in 1982, after Michael Suh was admitted to a Portland trade school. In the Ngemba language of Cameroon, Ndamukong means "House of Spears".

Suh has a Construction Management degree from the University of Nebraska and has aspirations to be a general contractor after his professional career. His father, Michael Suh, owns his own heating and cooling company in Portland. For his first two years in college before he knew about his professional prospects, Suh had wanted to "work with [his] dad and build his company up to be as big as possible" after graduation.

Suh has four sisters; he is the second oldest of the children. His older sister and manager, Odette Lennon Ngum Suh, played soccer collegiately at Mississippi State University and was previously a midfielder on the Cameroon women's national football team. His cousin, Kameron Chatman, played for the Michigan Wolverines men's basketball team.

Suh is a fan of Arsenal F.C.

In 2012, Suh participated in Fox's dating game show The Choice. Suh was nominated on Splash on March 10, 2013. He was eliminated on the 2nd week of the show.

During the 2013 Stanley Cup Playoffs, Suh rode the Zamboni at Joe Louis Arena wearing a Detroit Red Wings jersey during the Red Wings' playoff series against the Chicago Blackhawks.

Donation and endowment
On April 17, 2010, at the annual Husker Spring Game, Suh announced a $2.6 million donation to the University of Nebraska. Two million dollars of his gift will go to Nebraska Athletics for its Strength and Conditioning Program, and the remaining $600,000 will create an endowed scholarship for the UNL College of Engineering, from which he graduated in 2009 with a degree in construction management. His gift is the largest single charitable contribution by any former player and occurred before Suh was taken with the second overall pick in the 2010 NFL Draft. Suh, a former Grant High School football star, donated $250,000 toward the effort to bring a turf field to Grant High School in 2013.

Endorsements
Before Suh was drafted by an NFL team, he signed an endorsement deal with Nike. Suh also signed endorsement deals with Subway, Dick's Sporting Goods, Omaha Steaks, and Chrysler.

References

External links

Philadelphia Eagles bio
Nebraska Cornhuskers bio

1987 births
Living people
African Americans in Oregon
All-American college football players
American Conference Pro Bowl players
American football defensive tackles
American people of Cameroonian descent
American people of Jamaican descent
Cameroonian players of American football
Detroit Lions players
Grant High School (Portland, Oregon) alumni
Jamaican players of American football
Los Angeles Rams players
Miami Dolphins players
National Conference Pro Bowl players
Nebraska Cornhuskers football players
Participants in American reality television series
Philadelphia Eagles players
Players of American football from Portland, Oregon
Tampa Bay Buccaneers players
Unconferenced Pro Bowl players
Violence in sports